The 2009 European 10 m Events Championships was held in Prague, Czech Republic, form 19 to 22 February 2009.

Competitions were contested at the Arena O2.

Results

Men

Women

Medal table

See also
 European Shooting Confederation
 International Shooting Sport Federation
 List of medalists at the European Shooting Championships
 List of medalists at the European Shotgun Championships

References

External links
Official results

European Shooting Championships
European Shooting Championships
2009 European Shooting Championships
European 10 m Events Championships
Sports competitions in Prague